Pulse Rated was a radio station based in Salhouse in Norfolk, England. The station was previously known as Pulse Unsigned, and changed to Pulse Rated in Autumn 2005. The station was owned by Pulse Global.

Pulse Rated played a wide range of music from new, unsigned, and emerging artists.

Station overview
Pulse Rated was formed in 2003 with the mission of promoting music by unsigned artists within the recording industry. With the realisation that the majority of visitors to the website were fans rather than industry figures, the website was re-launched to cater for that audience and satellite radio broadcasts started on Sky Digital in the United Kingdom in late 2004.

Pulse Rated ceased broadcasting on Sky Digital on 6 February 2007.

The station was nominated in the "Best Radio Station" category at the 2006 BT Digital Music Awards.

The station was also an official media partner for Oxfam's first ever Oxjam event in 2006.

Artists whose music was played on the station include Leona Lewis, who won the 2006 series of The X Factor.

Pulse Rated went into liquidation in Autumn 2007.

External links
Pulse Rated UK

Online music stores of the United Kingdom
Radio stations in Norfolk